Bob Abbott (November 1, 1932 – March 23, 2010) was an American lawyer and jurist who served as a justice of the Kansas Supreme Court from September 1, 1990, to June 6, 2003.

Early life and education 
Abbott was born in Hodgeman County, Kansas. He earned an associate of arts degree from Dodge City Junior College, a Bachelor of Science from Emporia State University in 1956, and a law degree from Washburn University School of Law in 1960. He later in 1986 received a Masters in Law from the University of Virginia.

Career 
Abbot served in the United States Air Force, where he was a navigator on an Douglas C-124 Globemaster II. He worked as a lawyer for 17 years for a Junction City law firm. Prior to being appointed to the Kansas Supreme Court Abbott, had been the chief judge of the Kansas Court of Appeals. He had served on the Kansas Court of Appeals since its creation in 1977, and had written over 1000 court opinions.

Abbott was appointed to the Kansas Supreme Court to replace Chief Justice Robert H. Miller. Abbott retired from the court June 2003 and was replaced by Carol A. Beier.

References

External links 
 Find a Grave

Justices of the Kansas Supreme Court
University of Virginia School of Law alumni
Emporia State University alumni
1932 births
2010 deaths
20th-century American judges